Hoppea fastigiata is a species of herbaceous plant in the family Gentianaceae. It is a small branched herb with oppositely arranged ovate, subsessile leaves. White flowers appear in terminal or axillary cymes. Flowering and fruiting season is September-October.

References 

Gentianaceae